Irma Consuelo Cielo Serrano Castro (9 December 1933 – 1 March 2023) was a Mexican singer, actress and politician. Famous for her "tantalizing" "untamed spitfire" voice, she was one of the most noted performers of the ranchera and corrido genres; she was nicknamed La Tigresa de la Canción Ranchera and later known simply as "La Tigresa". At the same time, she pursued a film career with more than a dozen films. At the time of her death, she was one of the last surviving actresses from the Golden Age of Mexican cinema.

In the 1970s and 1980s, Serrano achieved great success as an actress and producer in a series of controversial stage plays, especially the controversial play Naná (1973). In the 1990s, she also ventured into politics and occupied a seat in the Mexican Senate.
In her later years, she was the center of multiple scandals and controversies. She appeared in celebrity gossip magazines and television shows because of her political career as senator for her home state of Chiapas from 1994 to 1997.

Early life
Serrano was the third of three children (Mario, Yolanda, and Irma). Her father, Santiago Serrano Ruiz "El Chanti" (25 July 1897 – 17 December 1957), was a distinguished author, poet, and politician born in Suchiapa. Her mother, María Castro Domínguez, was a local aristocrat who owned various haciendas. Her older siblings were Mario and Yolanda. Her parents divorced when she was 7 years old. She was a cousin of poet, author, and diplomat Rosario Castellanos.

Career

Music
Irma Serrano began her artistic career as a dancer in the choreographic group directed by the dancer Chelo La Rué. Later, Serrano began her career as singer when signing a contract with Columbia Records in 1962. In 1963, she won several awards such as the Folklore Revelation Trophy, the Macuilxóchitl as the Revelation Songwriter and the Musa Trophy of Radiolandia. Serrano became one of the most popular Mexican folk music artists of the 1960s. One of her most remembered songs is the corrido of La Martina, considered a classic of the Mexican folk genre.

Film

She began her career in films at age 29 in the movie Samson vs. the Zombies, starring the popular Mexican wrestler El Santo (Samson). She worked on films like The Extra (1962), opposite Cantinflas, Tiburoneros (1963, directed by Luis Alcoriza), and Gabino Barrera (1964) along with the actor and singer Antonio Aguilar, among others. From 1968, she began to use the pseudonym of La Tigresa (The Tigress), taken from a comic that she herself starred in due to its popularity. In the 1970s she participated in her best films. In 1972, she starred in La Martina, inspired by her most popular song. In 1973 she starred in the fantastic film La Tigresa. In that same year, she worked in the film The Monastery of the Vultures of the filmmaker Francisco del Villar.

At the end of the 1970s and during the 1980s, Serrano's appearances at the movies were rather sporadic. She performed special performances in films like Cabaret Nights (1978) and Lola la trailera (1982). In 1985 she produced Naná, inspired by the controversial stage play of the same name in which she herself starred years before. In 1986, Serrano made her last major film performance in the horror film The Lovers of the Lord of the Night next to Isela Vega and Emilio Fernández.

Theater

In 1972, Serrano acquired the old Virginia Fábregas Theater, located in Calle Donceles in Mexico City's Historic Center. The actress remodeled the theater and renamed it Teatro Fru Fru. From the 1970s, Serrano starred in and produced a series of theatrical montages that caused controversy, particularly Naná (1973), a free adaptation of Serrano of the novel of the same name by Émile Zola. The stage play was produced by Serrano and directed by Maricela Lara. Naná caused controversy in Mexico because of its highly erotic content, and it remained on the billboard for four uninterrupted years (1973–1977).

In 1977, Serrano partnered with actor, producer, writer and director Alejandro Jodorowsky to perform the stage play Lucrecia Borgia. Nevertheless, the differences between the two caused a dispute that led to them independently producing their own versions of the work.

Other stage plays starring Serrano in the Teatro Fru Frú were A Lady Without Camelias (1977), Oh ... Calcutta (1977), Yocasta Reina (1978), The Cross-legged War (1979) and the autobiographical A calzón amarrado (1980, based on the controversial book published by La Tigresa a little earlier). In addition to starring in these works, Serrano also served as co-producer, co-director and co-author of the scripts, some along with the director, actor and producer Pablo Leder.

Her last theatrical projects were The Two Emanuele (1984, alongside Isela Vega and also represented in the Million Dollar Theater of Los Angeles) and The Well of Solitude (1985).

As a producer, she also performed a series of theatrical productions, some of them as part of the successful Theater at Midnight concept, created by Pablo Leder for a strictly adult audience. These productions included Emanuele LIVE (1981), Jail for Girls (1981), Vampira! (Emanuele de ultratumba) (1983) and Carmen (2004).

Personal life
It was rumored that Serrano and Mexican president Gustavo Díaz Ordaz had a short-lived romantic liaison. Neither confirmed the rumor until she published her book A calzón amarrado, in which she admitted the affair.

In 1994, Serrano successfully ran for the Senate, representing her home state of Chiapas.

On 25 March 2009, Serrano was arrested in Chiapas and taken into custody to Mexico City's federal.

Serrano resided in Comitán, Chiapas. She died from a heart attack on 1 March 2023, at the age of 89.

Filmography

Television
2005 La Madrastra (TV series)
2004 Hospital el paisa (TV series)
1977 Variedades de media noche (TV series)
1974 La tierra (TV series)
1972 Aun hay mas (TV series)

Theater

Actress and producer
 Naná (1973)
 A Lady Without Camellias (1977)
 Oh...Calcutta (1977)
 Lucrecia Borgia (1977)
 Yocasta Reina (1978)
 The Cross-legged War (1979)
 A Calzón amarrado (1980)
 The Two Emanuele (1984)
 The Well of Solitude (1985)

Producer
 Emanuele...Live (1981)
 Jail for Girls (1981)
 Vampira! (Emanuele de Ultratumba) (1983)
 Carmen (2004)

Selected discography
 La Nueva Intérprete de la Canción Ranchera (Columbia, 1964)
 Lloren Organillos: Folk Songs of Mexico (Columbia, 1965)
 Nuevo "Hits" con Irma Serrano (Columbia, 1965)
 Mexican Fire (Columbia, 1966)
 Mi Noche de Ayer and Other Folk Songs (Columbia, 1968)
 Irma Serrano con Los Alegres de Terán (Columbia, 1973)
 15 auténticos éxitos (Columbia, 1984)

Awards
 1963: Trofeo Revelación Folkórica, Premio Macuilxóchitl como la Cancionista Revelación, Trofeo Musa de Radiolandia.

Bibliography
 SERRANO, Irma / ROBLEDO, Elisa A calzón amarrado Ed. Selector, México (1978) 
 SERRANO, Irma / ROBLEDO, Elisa Sin pelos en la lengua Ed. Selector, México (1979) 
 SERRANO, Irma / ROBLEDO, Elisa Una loca en la polaca, Ed. Selector, México (1992) ISBN 9684036493

References

External links
 
 

1933 births
2023 deaths
Mexican women singer-songwriters
Mexican film actresses
Mexican stage actresses
Mexican television actresses
Members of the Senate of the Republic (Mexico)
Ranchera singers
People from Comitán
Women members of the Senate of the Republic (Mexico)
Deputies of the LV Legislature of Mexico
Party of the Democratic Revolution politicians
Mexican actor-politicians
Folk-pop singers
20th-century Mexican actresses
21st-century Mexican actresses
20th-century Mexican women singers
21st-century Mexican women singers
Actresses from Chiapas
Singers from Chiapas